Everton Football Club, an association football club based in Liverpool, Merseyside, was founded in 1878 and competes in the top flight of English football the Premier League. Everton have a storied history winning nine League titles, five FA Cups and the European Cup Winners' Cup. 

Players of the club can be called up to represent their national team and to date 237 players have played at senior international level whilst registered with the club. 
Everton's first international was Job Wilding who appeared for Wales against England on 14 March 1885. The most recent newly capped player is Amadou Onana for Belgium against Netherlands on 25 September 2022.

Robert Warzycha became the first player from outside of the British Isles to represent his country, Poland in 1991 (Although some players born outside of the British Isles had played internationally for the club for Home Nation sides such as Pat Van Den Hauwe born in Belgium but representing Wales). Daniel Amokachi was the first non-European representative for Nigeria in 1993. 

Since 2016, Tim Howard holds the record for most caps won with 93 for United States of America, previously Neville Southall had held the record with 91 caps for Wales since the early 1990s.

Dixie Dean held the record for most international goals with 18 for England held from the 1930s, Tim Cahill matched this in 2012 for Australia. 

36 individual Everton players have represented their countries at the World Cup, with Everton being represented in 13 of the 22 tournaments (currently having taken part in 10 consecutive tournaments since 1986. Alex Parker the first in 1958 for Scotland. At the most recent 2018 World Cup 3 Everton players represented 3 countries. Tim Cahill, representing Australia, is the only player to appear at more than one tournament. 

Over 2600 caps for 42 countries have been earned by players while contracted to Everton.

The most Everton players to play in a single fixture was between Republic of Ireland and England on 7 June 2016 when five players (three for Ireland, two for England) appeared.

List of internationals
The following list includes only caps earned while contracted to Everton. 

Three Everton players (Eglington, Farrell and Stevenson) were dual internationals for Ireland. Their caps are listed separately below but included only once in the total player count of 235.

The following list includes only caps earned while playing for Everton. This includes players on loan to Everton but not players out on loan to other sides. For example: Neville Southall earned 92 Wales caps while contracted to Everton, one of these was while on loan to Port Vale and thus is not included.

Updated as of fixtures played 29 November 2022

World Cup players
The following were part of World Cup squads while playing for Everton.

AFC Asian Cup
The following were part of Asian Cup squads while playing for Everton.

CAF Africa Cup of Nations
The following were part of African Cup of Nations squads while playing for Everton.

CONCACAF Gold Cup
The following were part of Gold Cup squads while playing for Everton.

CONEBOL Copa America
The following were part of Copa America squads while playing for Everton.

UEFA European Championship
The following were part of European Championship squads while playing for Everton.

References

Everton
Internationals
Internationals
Internationals
Association football player non-biographical articles
Everton